The 92nd Academy Awards ceremony, presented by the Academy of Motion Picture Arts and Sciences (AMPAS), honored films released in 2019 and took place on February 9, 2020, at the Dolby Theatre in Hollywood, Los Angeles, beginning at 5:00 p.m. PST / 8:00 p.m. EST. During the ceremony, the AMPAS presented Academy Awards (commonly referred to as Oscars) in 24 categories. The ceremony, televised in the United States by ABC, was produced by Stephanie Allain and Lynette Howell Taylor and was directed by Glenn Weiss. Three months earlier in a ceremony at the Ray Dolby Ballroom of the Hollywood & Highland Center in Hollywood held on October 27, 2019, the Academy held its 11th Annual Governors Awards ceremony.

Parasite won four awards including Best Picture, becoming the first non-English language film to win that award. Other winners include 1917 with three awards, Ford v Ferrari, Joker, and Once Upon a Time in Hollywood with two awards, and American Factory, Bombshell, Hair Love, Jojo Rabbit, Judy, Learning to Skateboard in a Warzone (If You're a Girl), Little Women, Marriage Story, The Neighbors' Window, Rocketman, and Toy Story 4 with one. The telecast garnered 23.64 million viewers, making it the third-least watched Oscar broadcast since 1974 when Nielsen began keeping records of viewership.

Winners and nominees 

The nominees for the 92nd Academy Awards were announced on January 13, 2020, at the David Geffen Theater of the Academy Museum of Motion Pictures in Los Angeles, California, by actors John Cho and Issa Rae. Joker led all nominees with eleven nominations; The Irishman, 1917, and Once Upon a Time in Hollywood tied for second with ten nominations each. This marked the first time in Oscars' history that four films each earned ten or more nominations.

The winners were announced during the awards ceremony on February 9, 2020. Parasite became the first non-English language film to win Best Picture. It was also the sixth film nominated for both Best Picture and Best International Feature in the same year. Furthermore, its four wins tied it with Fanny and Alexander and Crouching Tiger, Hidden Dragon as the most-awarded foreign language films in Academy Awards history. With his wins in Best Picture, Director, and Original Screenplay, as well as his accepting of the award for International Feature Film on behalf of South Korea, Bong Joon-ho was the second person to collect four statuettes in a single ceremony since Walt Disney at the 26th Academy Awards held in 1954 and the first to do so for a single film.

As a result of Joaquin Phoenix winning Best Actor for his performance as the titular character in the film Joker, he and Heath Ledger, who previously won for playing the same character in 2008's The Dark Knight, became the second pair of actors to win for portraying the same character in two different films. Scarlett Johansson was the twelfth actor to receive double acting nominations in the same year. With her nominations in Best Actress and Best Original Song for Harriet, Cynthia Erivo became the third consecutive person to earn acting and songwriting nominations for the same film after Mary J. Blige for 2017's Mudbound and Lady Gaga for 2018's A Star Is Born. Best Original Score winner Hildur Guðnadóttir was the third woman to win for composing a musical score and the first one to do so for a dramatic musical score. Honeyland became the first film to be nominated for both Best International Feature Film and Best Documentary Feature.

Awards 

Winners are listed first, highlighted in boldface, and indicated with a double dagger.

{| class=wikitable role="presentation"
|-
| style="vertical-align:top; width:50%;"|

 Parasite – Kwak Sin-ae and Bong Joon-ho Ford v Ferrari – Peter Chernin, Jenno Topping, and James Mangold
 The Irishman – Martin Scorsese, Robert De Niro, Jane Rosenthal, and Emma Tillinger Koskoff
 Jojo Rabbit – Carthew Neal, Taika Waititi, and Chelsea Winstanley
 Joker – Todd Phillips, Bradley Cooper, and Emma Tillinger Koskoff
 Little Women – Amy Pascal
 Marriage Story – Noah Baumbach and David Heyman
 1917 – Sam Mendes, Pippa Harris, Jayne-Ann Tenggren, and Callum McDougal
 Once Upon a Time in Hollywood – David Heyman, Shannon McIntosh, and Quentin Tarantino
| style="vertical-align:top; width:50%;"|

 Bong Joon-ho – Parasite
 Martin Scorsese – The Irishman
 Todd Phillips – Joker
 Sam Mendes – 1917
 Quentin Tarantino – Once Upon a Time in Hollywood
|-
| style="vertical-align:top; width:50%;"|

 Joaquin Phoenix – Joker as Arthur Fleck / Joker
 Antonio Banderas – Pain and Glory as Salvador Mallo
 Leonardo DiCaprio – Once Upon a Time in Hollywood as Rick Dalton
 Adam Driver – Marriage Story as Charlie Barber
 Jonathan Pryce – The Two Popes as Cardinal Jorge Mario Bergoglio
| style="vertical-align:top; width:50%;"|

 Renée Zellweger – Judy as Judy Garland
 Cynthia Erivo – Harriet as Harriet Tubman
 Scarlett Johansson – Marriage Story as Nicole Barber
 Saoirse Ronan – Little Women as Josephine "Jo" March
 Charlize Theron – Bombshell as Megyn Kelly
|-
| style="vertical-align:top; width:50%;"|

 Brad Pitt – Once Upon a Time in Hollywood as Cliff Booth
 Tom Hanks – A Beautiful Day in the Neighborhood as Fred Rogers
 Anthony Hopkins – The Two Popes as Pope Benedict XVI
 Al Pacino – The Irishman as Jimmy Hoffa
 Joe Pesci – The Irishman as Russell Bufalino
| style="vertical-align:top; width:50%;"|

 Laura Dern – Marriage Story as Nora Fanshaw
 Kathy Bates – Richard Jewell as Barbara "Bobi" Jewell
 Scarlett Johansson – Jojo Rabbit as Rosie Betzler
 Florence Pugh – Little Women as Amy March
 Margot Robbie – Bombshell as Kayla Pospisil
|-
| style="vertical-align:top; width:50%;"|

 Parasite – Screenplay by Bong Joon-ho and Han Jin-won; story by Bong Joon-ho
 Knives Out – Rian Johnson
 Marriage Story – Noah Baumbach
 1917 – Sam Mendes and Krysty Wilson-Cairns
 Once Upon a Time in Hollywood – Quentin Tarantino
| style="vertical-align:top; width:50%;"|

 Jojo Rabbit – Taika Waititi;  The Irishman – Steven Zaillian; 
 Joker – Todd Phillips and Scott Silver; 
 Little Women – Greta Gerwig; 
 The Two Popes – Anthony McCarten; 
|-
| style="vertical-align:top; width:50%;"|

 Toy Story 4 – Josh Cooley, Jonas Rivera, and Mark Nielsen How to Train Your Dragon: The Hidden World – Dean DeBlois, Bonnie Arnold, and Brad Lewis
 I Lost My Body – Jérémy Clapin and Marc du Pontavice
 Klaus – Sergio Pablos, Jinko Gotoh, and Marisa Román
 Missing Link – Chris Butler, Arianne Sutner, and Travis Knight
| style="vertical-align:top; width:50%;"|

 Parasite (South Korea) in Korean – directed by Bong Joon-ho Corpus Christi (Poland) in Polish – directed by Jan Komasa
 Honeyland (North Macedonia) in Turkish and Macedonian – directed by Tamara Kotevska and Ljubomir Stefanov
 Les Misérables (France) in French – directed by Ladj Ly
 Pain and Glory (Spain) in Spanish – directed by Pedro Almodóvar
|-
| style="vertical-align:top; width:50%;"|

 American Factory – Steven Bognar, Julia Reichert, and Jeff Reichert The Cave – Feras Fayyad, Kirstine Barfod, and Sigrid Dyekjær
 The Edge of Democracy – Petra Costa, Joanna Natasegara, Shane Boris, and Tiago Pavan
 For Sama – Waad Al-Kateab and Edward Watts
 Honeyland – Ljubomir Stefanov, Tamara Kotevska, and Atanas Georgiev
| style="vertical-align:top; width:50%;"|

 Learning to Skateboard in a Warzone (If You're a Girl) – Carol Dysinger and Elena Andreicheva In the Absence – Yi Seung-Jun and Gary Byung-Seok Kam
 Life Overtakes Me – John Haptas and Kristine Samuelson
 St. Louis Superman – Smriti Mundhra and Sami Khan
 Walk Run Cha-Cha – Laura Nix and Colette Sandstedt
|-
| style="vertical-align:top; width:50%;"|

 The Neighbors' Window – Marshall Curry Brotherhood – Meryam Joobeur and Maria Gracia Turgeon
 Nefta Football Club – Yves Piat and Damien Megherbi
 Saria – Bryan Buckley and Matt Lefebvre
 A Sister – Delphine Girard
| style="vertical-align:top; width:50%;"|

 Hair Love – Matthew A. Cherry and Karen Rupert Toliver Dcera (Daughter) – Daria Kashcheeva
 Kitbull – Rosana Sullivan and Kathryn Hendrickson
 Mémorable – Bruno Collet and Jean-François Le Corre
 Sister – Siqi Song
|-
| style="vertical-align:top; width:50%;"|

 Joker – Hildur Guðnadóttir Little Women – Alexandre Desplat
 Marriage Story – Randy Newman
 1917 – Thomas Newman
 Star Wars: The Rise of Skywalker – John Williams
| style="vertical-align:top; width:50%;"|

 "(I'm Gonna) Love Me Again" from Rocketman – Music by Elton John; lyrics by Bernie Taupin "I Can't Let You Throw Yourself Away" from Toy Story 4 – Music and lyrics by Randy Newman
 "I'm Standing with You" from Breakthrough – Music and lyrics by Diane Warren
 "Into the Unknown" from Frozen II – Music and lyrics by Kristen Anderson-Lopez and Robert Lopez
 "Stand Up" from Harriet – Music and lyrics by Joshuah Brian Campbell and Cynthia Erivo
|-
| style="vertical-align:top; width:50%;"|

 Ford v Ferrari – Donald Sylvester Joker – Alan Robert Murray
 1917 – Oliver Tarney and Rachael Tate
 Once Upon a Time in Hollywood – Wylie Stateman
 Star Wars: The Rise of Skywalker – Matthew Wood and David Acord
| style="vertical-align:top; width:50%;"|

 1917 – Mark Taylor and Stuart Wilson Ad Astra – Gary Rydstrom, Tom Johnson, and Mark Ulano
 Ford v Ferrari – Paul Massey, David Giammarco, and Steven A. Morrow
 Joker – Tom Ozanich, Dean Zupancic, and Tod Maitland
 Once Upon a Time in Hollywood – Michael Minkler, Christian P. Minkler, and Mark Ulano
|-
| style="vertical-align:top; width:50%;"|

 Once Upon a Time in Hollywood – Production Design: Barbara Ling; Set Decoration: Nancy Haigh The Irishman – Production Design: Bob Shaw; Set Decoration: Regina Graves
 Jojo Rabbit – Production Design: Ra Vincent; Set Decoration: Nora Sopková
 1917 – Production Design: Dennis Gassner; Set Decoration: Lee Sandales
 Parasite – Production Design: Lee Ha-jun; Set Decoration: Cho Won-woo
| style="vertical-align:top; width:50%;"|

 1917 – Roger Deakins The Irishman – Rodrigo Prieto
 Joker – Lawrence Sher
 The Lighthouse – Jarin Blaschke
 Once Upon a Time in Hollywood – Robert Richardson
|-
| style="vertical-align:top; width:50%;"|

 Bombshell – Kazu Hiro, Anne Morgan, and Vivian Baker Joker – Nicki Ledermann and Kay Georgiou
 Judy – Jeremy Woodhead
 Maleficent: Mistress of Evil – Paul Gooch, Arjen Tuiten, and David White
 1917 – Naomi Donne, Tristan Versluis, and Rebecca Cole
| style="vertical-align:top; width:50%;"|

 Little Women – Jacqueline Durran The Irishman – Sandy Powell and Christopher Peterson
 Jojo Rabbit – Mayes C. Rubeo
 Joker – Mark Bridges
 Once Upon a Time in Hollywood – Arianne Phillips
|-
| style="vertical-align:top; width:50%;"|

 Ford v Ferrari – Andrew Buckland and Michael McCusker The Irishman – Thelma Schoonmaker
 Jojo Rabbit – Tom Eagles
 Joker – Jeff Groth
 Parasite – Yang Jin-mo
| style="vertical-align:top; width:50%;"|

 1917'' – Guillaume Rocheron, Greg Butler, and Dominic Tuohy
 Avengers: Endgame – Dan DeLeeuw, Russell Earl, Matt Aitken, and Dan Sudick
 The Irishman – Pablo Helman, Leandro Estebecorena, Nelson Sepuvelda-Fauser, and Stephane Grabli
 The Lion King – Robert Legato, Adam Valdez, Andrew R. Jones, and Elliot Newman
 Star Wars: The Rise of Skywalker – Roger Guyett, Neal Scanlan, Patrick Tubach, and Dominic Tuohy
|}

 Governors Awards 
The Academy held its 11th annual Governors Awards ceremony on October 27, 2019, during which the following awards were presented:

Honorary Academy Awards
 David Lynch  "For fearlessly breaking boundaries in pursuit of his singular cinematic vision."
 Wes Studi  "In recognition of the power and craft he brings to his indelible film portrayals and for his steadfast support of the Native American community."
 Lina Wertmüller  "For her provocative disruption of political and social norms delivered with bravery through her weapon of choice: the camera lens."

Jean Hersholt Humanitarian Award
 Geena Davis  For her work fighting for gender-parity in media through her Geena Davis Institute on Gender in Media.

 Films with multiple nominations and awards 

Presenters and performers
The following individuals, listed in order of appearance, presented awards or performed musical numbers.

Presenters

Performers

 Ceremony 
Originally in April 2017, the Academy had scheduled the 92nd ceremony for February 23, 2020. However, due to record low television viewership and ratings attained by recent Oscar broadcasts, the AMPAS Board of Governors decided to move the date for the 2020 gala by two weeks to February 9 in hopes of combating film awards season fatigue. This marked the earliest date on which the ceremony has been held. Furthermore, in light of the recent success of last year's hostless ceremony that resulted in an improvement in ratings, ABC entertainment president Karey Burke announced the event would proceed without a host for the second consecutive year. Burke stated the ceremony would feature "huge entertainment values, big musical numbers, comedy, and star power".

Several other people participated in the production of the ceremony. Production designer Jason Sherwood designed an ambitiously technological stage design for the ceremony which prominently featured a sculptural shell that protruded toward the audience and 1,100 Swarovski crystals. Furthermore, the stage itself was used to display movie clips and nominations graphics packages instead of projecting those images onto a regular rectangular screen. Rickey Minor served as musical director and conductor for the ceremony. Musician Questlove served as an in-house DJ during the gala. Rapper Eminem made a surprise appearance during the ceremony to perform his Oscar-winning song "Lose Yourself" from the 2002 film 8 Mile after being absent from the 75th ceremony in 2003 to perform the song. During the performance of excerpts from the Best Original Score nominees, Eímear Noone became the first woman to conduct the orchestra during an Oscar ceremony.

Category renaming and rule changes
During its board of directors meeting in April 2019, the Academy voted to rename the Best Foreign Language Film category to Best International Feature Film. In a press release justifying the name change, International Feature Film Committee co-chairs Larry Karaszewski and Diane Weyermann stated, "We have noted that the reference to 'foreign' is outdated within the global filmmaking community. We believe that international feature film better represents this category, and promotes a positive and inclusive view of filmmaking, and the art of film as a universal experience." However, the requirement for nominees to have the majority of their dialogue be in a language other than English remained in force.

Rule changes were also approved by the AMPAS Board of Directors. The category of Best Makeup and Hairstyling was expanded from a roster consisting of three nominees to five nominees, with the pre-nominations shortlist also expanded from seven films to ten. In addition, the Academy voted to drop the requirement of eight theatrically-released animated feature films in a calendar year in order for the category of Best Animated Feature to be activated, and nominations voting in that category would be open to all active Short Films and Animation Branch members. Finally, prospective nominees for Best Animated Short Film and Best Live Action Short Film could now premiere theatrically in either Los Angeles County or New York City in order to be eligible for consideration.

Box office performance of Best Picture nominees
When the nominations were announced, seven of the nine films nominated for Best Picture had earned a combined gross of $747.2 million at the American and Canadian box offices at the time. Joker was the highest-grossing film among the Best Picture nominees with $334 million in domestic box office receipts. Once Upon a Time in Hollywood came in second with $141.1 million; this was followed by Ford v. Ferrari ($111 million), Little Women ($74 million), 1917 ($39.2 million), Parasite ($25.4 million), and Jojo Rabbit ($22 million). Box office grosses for The Irishman and Marriage Story were unavailable due to their distributor Netflix's policy of refusing to release such figures.

Critical reviews
The show received a mixed reception from media publications. Some media outlets received the broadcast positively. Television critic James Poniewozik of The New York Times wrote, "The ceremony was most effective when it simply got out of the way of its stars' shine." He added, "At its absolute best, this Oscars succeeded with what you can't script: great artists being recognized, and recognizing others." Matthew Gilbert from The Boston Globe commented, "Sometimes, a few good moments are enough to get you there. And there were a few good ones throughout the Oscarcast Sunday night, which, like every Oscarcast ever, hosted or host-free, predictable or filled with surprises, jubilant or downbeat, was longer than it needed to be." Entertainment Weekly columnist Darren Franlch remarked, "The 2020 Oscars were a bit of a shambles, and we can definitely lose all the introducers next year. But the last hour had the quality of a well-deserved coronation. Four wins for Parasite? I was so happy that I lost myself."

Others were more critical of the show. Columnist Kristin Turnquist of The Oregonian quipped, "If the 2020 Oscars broadcast was competing for a 'Most Confusing Mess of an Awards Show' trophy, it really hit the mark. But that’s the best that can be said for the 92nd Annual Academy Awards, which, despite a few surprises, was mostly predictable and seemed to go on forever." Television critic Lorraine Ali from the Los Angeles Times wrote, "This year's Oscars ceremony showed an art form in dire need of a relevancy check. Instead we got the biggest rap act of 2002 and a whole lot of jokes about the industry’s inability to see its own stasis." Entertainment editor Bruce Miller of the Sioux City Journal noted, "Because it lacked focus (a host was needed), this year's Academy Awards rambled as much as Zellweger and Phoenix. Someone like Jimmy Kimmel or Ellen DeGeneres could have prevented some of the train wrecks and made more of its wins.

 Ratings and reception 
The American telecast on ABC drew in an average of 23.64 million people over its length, which was a 20% decrease from the previous year's ceremony. The show also earned lower Nielsen ratings compared to the previous ceremony with 13.6% of households watching the ceremony. In addition, it garnered a lower rating among viewers between ages 18-49 with a 5.3 rating among viewers in that demographic. Furthermore, some media outlets pointed out that the 62nd Grammy Awards that were broadcast on CBS two weeks earlier earned a higher 18-49 demographic rating with a 5.4 figure. It earned the lowest viewership for an Academy Award telecast since figures were compiled beginning with the 46th ceremony in 1974.

In July 2020, the show received nine nominations at the 72nd Primetime Creative Arts Emmys. Two months later, the ceremony won two of those nominations for Outstanding Production Design for a Variety Special (Jason Sherwood and Alana Billingsley) and Outstanding Sound Mixing for a Variety Series or Special (Paul Sandweiss, Tommy Vicari, Biff Dawes, Pablo Munguia, Kristian Pedregon, Patrick Baltzell, Michael Parker, Christian Schrader, John Perez, Marc Repp, and Thomas Pesa).

"In Memoriam"
The annual "In Memoriam" segment was presented by Steven Spielberg. Singers Billie Eilish and Finneas O'Connell performed The Beatles song "Yesterday" during the tribute.

 Kobe Bryant – athlete, producer
 Rip Torn – actor
 Barbara Hammer – filmmaker
 Patricia Blau – visual effects
 Bernie Pollack – costume designer
 Steve Golin – producer, executive
 Paul LeBlanc – hairstylist
 John Briley – writer
 Diahann Carroll – actress, singer
 Terry Jones – writer, director, actor
 Catherine Burns – actress
 Agnès Varda – director, writer
 Wayne Fitzgerald – title designer
 David Foster – producer
 Danny Aiello – actor
 Buck Henry – writer, actor, director
 Stanley Donen – director, choreographer
 David V. Picker – producer, executive
 Barry Malkin – film editor
 Robert Forster – actor
 Robert Evans – producer, executive, actor
 Richard Williams – animator
 Machiko Kyō – actress
 James R. Alexander – sound mixer
 Anna Karina – actress
 D. A. Pennebaker – documentarian
 Leonard Goldberg – producer, executive
 Fernando Luján – actor
 André Previn – composer, conductor
 Peter Mayhew – actor
 Sylvia Miles – actress
 William J. Creber – production designer
 Godfrey Gao – actor
 Bibi Andersson – actress
 Michael Lynne – executive, producer
 Gene Warren Jr. – special effects, visual effects
 Alvin Sargent – writer
 Doris Day – actress
 Anna Udvardy – producer
 Sid Ramin – composer, arranger
 Michelle Guish – casting director
 Sidney Sheinberg – executive, producer
 Ben Barenholtz – distributor, executive, producer
 Joss Williams – special effects
 Piero Tosi – costume designer
 Kenneth Walker – hairstylist
 Rutger Hauer – actor
 Syd Mead – designer, concept artist
 Harriet Frank Jr. – writer
 Franco Zeffirelli – director
 John Witherspoon – actor
 Bernard Chevry – producer
 Seymour Cassel – actor
 Peter Fonda – actor, director, writer
 Branko Lustig – producer
 Gerry Smith – marketing executive
 John Singleton – director, writer, producer
 Kirk Douglas – actor, producer

 See also 

 List of submissions to the 92nd Academy Awards for Best International Feature Film
 Autograph suit of Sandy Powell

 Notes 

 References 

 External links 

Official websites
 
 
 Oscars Channel at YouTube (run by the Academy of Motion Picture Arts and Sciences)

News resources
 Oscars 2020 at BBC News
 Oscars 2020 at The Guardian''

Other resources
 

Academy Awards ceremonies
2019 film awards
2020 awards in the United States
2020 in Los Angeles
February 2020 events in the United States
Television shows directed by Glenn Weiss